Nahum Stelmach (– ) was an Israeli footballer and manager.

Biography
Stelmach was born in Petah Tikva, British Mandate of Palestine (now Israel), to a Jewish family. He was chosen third by Yediot Aharonots greatest Israeli footballers. He made a name for himself as the leader of Hapoel Petah Tikva.
At the height of his career in Hapoel Petah Tikva, Stelmach received offers to sign for Arsenal and Fenerbahçe but declined due to his loyalty to the team. He led his team to five national championships, four of them consecutive.

His most recognizable attribute was the quality of his headers, with which he scored most of his international goals. As a result, he was commonly nicknamed "the golden head" in Israel.

He scored what was arguably his most famous goal for the Israeli national football team in an Olympic qualifier against The USSR, with Lev Yashin as goalkeeper at the Ramat Gan Stadium on 1956. Despite the fact that Israel lost the game 2:1 (his goal was a temporary equalizer), and that the game was not televised, that goal is widely considered a defining moment in the history of Israel's national team's early years.

Coach
He was the trainer of Hapoel Haifa in the 1970s, while training the international stars Yochanan Vollach and Itzhak Englander.

HonorsNational league (1st tier) (6):
1954–55,  1958–59, 1959–60, 1960–61, 1961–62,  1962–63Israel State Cup (1)':
1956–57

References

1936 births
1999 deaths
20th-century Israeli Jews
Jewish footballers
Israeli footballers
Israel international footballers
1956 AFC Asian Cup players
1960 AFC Asian Cup players
1964 AFC Asian Cup players
Hapoel Petah Tikva F.C. players
Bnei Yehuda Tel Aviv F.C. players
Hapoel Herzliya F.C. players
Footballers from Petah Tikva
Hapoel Haifa F.C. managers
Hapoel Be'er Sheva F.C. managers
Hapoel Petah Tikva F.C. managers
Hapoel Jerusalem F.C. managers
Beitar Jerusalem F.C. managers
Maccabi Petah Tikva F.C. managers
Beitar Tel Aviv Bat Yam F.C. managers
Hapoel Hadera F.C. managers
Maccabi Ramat Amidar F.C. managers
Footballers at the 1958 Asian Games
Association football forwards
Asian Games competitors for Israel
Israeli football managers
Association football player-managers
Israel national football team managers